The Geffen Playhouse (or the Geffen) is a not-for-profit theater company founded by Gilbert Cates in 1995. It produces plays in two theaters in Geffen Playhouse, which is owned by University of California Los Angeles. The Playhouse is located in the Westwood neighborhood of Los Angeles, California. It was named for donor David Geffen. The current executive director is Gil Cates Jr.

History
The Geffen Playhouse was built in 1929 as the Masonic Affiliates Club, or the MAC, for students and alumni at UCLA. One of the first 12 structures built in Westwood Village, it was designed by architect Stiles O. Clements. 

Its courtyard fountain is a piece from Malibu Potteries; the two patterns can be seen on and in Malibu Potteries founder Rhoda May Knight Rindge's daughter's house, the Adamson House, which Clements designed (the same year he designed the Geffen) and for which Rindge provided the tile. The pattern on the lower tier of the Geffen's fountain appears in the Adamson House dining room, while the pattern on the upper tier can be seen on the east exterior face of the dining room, bordering a Moorish arch window.

Originally named the  Contempo Theatre, and later the Westwood Playhouse, the property was purchased by UCLA in 1993. UCLA's then chancellor, Charles E. Young, appointed Gil Cates, founder and former president of the UCLA School of Theater, Film and Television, as its producing director. 

The theater was renamed in 1995 after media mogul David Geffen donated $5 million, one of the largest philanthropic donations ever made to an already constructed theater.

In 2002, the David Geffen Foundation made a $5-million lead gift towards an eventual $17-million capital campaign to renovate the theater, which was originally a Masonic lodge. The renovation gutted the theater while keeping its historical character. The Geffen reopened on November 16, 2005 with the main 500-seat theater retained and a new 125-seat Audrey Skirball-Kenis Theater added. 

In March 2010, the Playhouse's board of directors named the main stage the Gil Cates Theater. Geffen Playhouse founder Gil Cates Sr. died in October 2011.  

Gil Cates, Jr. was appointed executive director in 2004. Two funding drives followed, the Geffen Playhouse Legacy Fund and the Innovation Fund.

The Geffen Playhouse offers five plays per season in the Gil Cates Theater and three plays per season in the Audrey Skirball Kenis Theater, as well as producing special events in both venues. The Playhouse is known for performances by film and television actors, including Nikolaj Coster-Waldau, Idina Menzel, Andy Garcia, Dulé Hill, Jason Alexander, Debbie Allen, Annette Bening, Thora Birch, Dana Delany, Roma Downey, Peter Falk, Ginnifer Goodwin, Neil Patrick Harris, David Hyde Pierce, Carrie Fisher, Jane Kaczmarek, Alfred Molina, Rebecca Pidgeon, George Segal, Martin Short, Alicia Silverstone, Rita Wilson, and James Van Der Beek.

In August 2017, Matt Shakman was appointed as the new artistic director of the Geffen Playhouse.

Awards and nominations

References

External links
Geffen Playhouse website
 UCLA School of Theater, Film, and Television website
 Ronald Frink Architects - (http://www.rfa-architects.com)

Theatres in Los Angeles
University of California, Los Angeles buildings and structures
University of California, Los Angeles
Performing groups established in 1993
Westwood, Los Angeles
1993 establishments in California
David Geffen